Jacob Lynn "Jake" Pavelka (born January 27, 1978) is an American television personality, pilot, actor, and model who appeared on six reality TV programs, most notably The Bachelor. He is also the CEO of the company "Rhino Removal".

Early life and career 
Pavelka was born in Dallas, Texas to Sallie Lanell (née Mack), a nurse, and James Lynn Pavelka. He is the middle of three sons. His brothers, Jason and Matthew, are both married. He has two nephews. Pavelka grew up in Denton, Texas, and he started taking flying lessons when he was twelve. He eventually worked as a pilot for Atlantic Southeast Airlines, and under the name of Jake Landrum, acted in several television commercials and programs produced in the Dallas area. Pavelka is a cousin of fitness model, television presenter, actor and personal trainer Jessie Pavelka. Pavelka participates in triathlons and has been active in fitness throughout his life.

As of 2022, he is the Chief Executive Officer of "Rhino Removal" company.

Reality television 
Pavelka first appeared as a contestant in 2009, in the fifth season of the ABC reality show The Bachelorette. He was eliminated by the Canadian Jillian Harris before hometowns, but was brought back by the network to star in the 14th season of its series The Bachelor in 2010. The program's run ended with Pavelka proposing marriage to contestant Vienna Girardi in the March 2010 finale. They split up in June 2010.

Following the end of The Bachelor, Pavelka was named as one of the celebrity contestants for the tenth season of Dancing with the Stars. He and his partner, Chelsie Hightower, were the fifth to be eliminated, in April 2010. In July 2011, Pavelka was a contestant on the second season of Bachelor Pad. He was also a contestant on VH1's 2011 reality series Famous Food, and appeared on a September 2011 episode of The CW's reality show H8R. In 2014, he was a contestant on Rachael vs. Guy: Celebrity Cook-Off. On May 23, 2016, he appeared as a surprise guest on the Bachelorette with JoJo Fletcher.

Other work
In June 2010, Pavelka was scheduled to guest-star on an episode of Drop Dead Diva as Toby Devlin, contestant on a fictional reality dating show.
On January 14, 2011, he guest-starred on The Bold and the Beautiful.
 
From February to March 2012, he was a celebrity guest host at the Chippendales' show in Las Vegas.

In 2020, Jake opened an account on the "Cameo" website where he uploads greeting videos to anyone who asks. As of today, the account is still active.

Filmography

References

External links

Jake Pavelka's official YouTube

1978 births
Living people
People from Dallas
Aviators from Texas
Embry–Riddle Aeronautical University alumni
People from Denton, Texas
Players of American football from Texas
Atlantic Southeast Airlines
People from Daytona Beach, Florida
Male models from Texas
American male erotic dancers
American male triathletes
American aerospace engineers
American male child actors
American people of Czech descent
Male actors from Texas
University of North Texas alumni
Sportspeople from the Dallas–Fort Worth metroplex
Bachelor Nation contestants
American flight instructors